Langstrothdale is a scenic valley in the Yorkshire Dales in North Yorkshire, England. The uppermost course of the River Wharfe runs through it, but Wharfedale does not begin until the Wharfe meets Cray Gill, downstream of Hubberholme. The name Langstrothdale derives from Old English and translates as 'long marsh' or 'marshy ground'.

The dale was first colonised by Anglians in the seventh century, with Norse invaders arriving later. In Norman times, many of the isolated settlements were allowed to remain, but were prevented from expanding by an arcane ruling known as the 'Forest Law'. At that time, Langstrothdale was well forested, and the upper northern part of the dale (which is now moorland) was a royal hunting forest known as Langstrothdale Chase or as the 'Forest of Langstroth'.

The dale became part of the lands owned by the Clifford family and in 1604, due to the then Earl of Cumberland's 'extravagances', the lands were sold to pay off his debts. This allowed many Dalesfolk to purchase their own farmsteads.

In the age before mass transportation, the road through the dale was part of a packhorse route from Lancaster to Newcastle upon Tyne.

Settlements 
Hubberholme
Yockenthwaite
Deepdale
Beckermonds
Oughtershaw

References

Bibliography

Valleys of North Yorkshire
Yorkshire Dales
River Wharfe